Aliabad (also Romanized as ‘Alīābād) is a village in Fin Rural District, Fin District, Bandar Abbas County, Hormozgan Province, Iran. At the 2006 census, its population was 115, in 27 families.

References 

Populated places in Bandar Abbas County